The women's parallel giant slalom event in snowboarding at the 2006 Winter Olympics was held in Bardonecchia, a village in the Province of Turin, Italy. The competition took place on 23 February 2006.

Medalists

Qualification
The qualification runs started at 11 a.m.(UTC+1)

The athletes were allowed two runs, one on the blue course and one on the red course.  The two times were added, and the top 16 snowboarders moved on to the 1/8 finals.

Elimination round
The elimination rounds started at 2 p.m.(UTC+1)

Medal round

Classification 5–8

The four quarterfinal losers entered the consolation bracket, where they raced for positions five through eight.

References

Snowboarding at the 2006 Winter Olympics
2006 in women's sport
Women's events at the 2006 Winter Olympics